Zaida may refer to:
Zaida, Khyber Pakhtunkhwa, a town in northern Pakistan
Zaida, Morocco, a town in central Morocco
Zaida of Seville, an 11th-century exile Muslim princess who was the mistress of King Alfonso VI of Castile
Zaida, a Yiddish informal title for "grandfather"